Harry Schachter FRSC (born 25 February 1933 in Vienna, Austria) is a Canadian biochemist and glycobiologist, and professor emeritus at the University of Toronto and the Hospital For Sick Children in Toronto, Canada.

Biography
Harry Schachter was born in Vienna, Austria in 1933, to Miriam Freund, a businesswoman, and to Ulrich (Usher) Schachter, a dentist and medical doctor. Harry's father was the cousin of Austro-Hungarian and Romanian tenor and actor, Joseph Schmidt. The Schachter family fled the Nazis in 1938, escaping to Port of Spain, Trinidad. He attended secondary school at Saint Mary's College, placing first in Trinidad in the Cambridge Advanced Level Examinations, and winning the Jerningham Gold Medal and the Island Scholarship in Mathematics. He also worked part-time as a reporter for the local Guardian newspaper. His family immigrated to Toronto, Canada in 1951.

Education and career 
At the University of Toronto, Schachter completed his BA in Physiology and Biochemistry in 1955, his MD in 1959, and his PhD in Biochemistry (Gordon Dixon, supervisor) in 1964. Upon completion of his PhD he was appointed an assistant professor in the Department of Biochemistry. He did his post-doctoral work in glycobiology with Saul Roseman at Johns Hopkins University from 1966 to 1968. He returned to the University of Toronto in 1968, where he established his lab in the Department of Biochemistry.

In 1976, Schachter took a position in the Division of Biochemistry Research at the Hospital for Sick Children, which he headed for 13 years. From 1984 to 1989 he also chaired the Department of Biochemistry at the University of Toronto.

His contributions to the field of carbohydrate biochemistry include the discovery and characterization of 12 glycosyltransferases involved in the synthesis of N- and O-linked glycans, thereby defining processes crucial for the formation of branched oligosaccharides on glycoproteins that include cell surface receptors and secreted proteins. Schachter also helped characterize the first Carbohydrate-Deficient Glycoprotein Syndrome (CDG-IIa; now known as Congenital Disorders of Glycosylation). He helped show that GnTII null mice are excellent models for human CDG-IIa. Other work on mice involving null mutations in GnTI, GnTII and GnTIII established the importance of N-glycans in metazoan development. Additionally, Schachter explored the biological functions of complex carbohydrates in Drosophila brain development that demonstrated a tissue-specific role in the regulation of insulin signaling and life span. His translational/clinical work also included enzymatic discoveries in the complex muscle-eye-brain diseases (e.g. congenital muscular dystrophy) associated with defective O-glycosylation. He has published over 160 scientific papers, reviews, and commentaries.

Schachter served as post doc supervisor and mentor to scientists in his lab, and collaborated with these and other scientists in Canada, Europe, Japan and the USA. Collaborators include David Williams, Inka Brockhausen, Clifford Lingwood, Mohan Sarkar, Pamela Stanley, Noam Harpaz, Louis Siminovitch, Jeremy Carver, Hudson Freeze, Jaak Jaeken, Jamey Marth, Hans Vliegenthart, Vernon Reinhold, Reinhart Reithmeier, Kevin Campbell, Gabrielle Boulianne, Jenny Tan, Andrew Spence, Folkert Reck, Jiri Vajsar, Saroja Narasimhan, Bob (RK) Murray, GD Longmore, Jenny Chan, and Brad Bendiak.

Awards and honors 
 2011: Austrian Cross of Honour for Science and Art First Class
 2010: Rosalind Kornfeld Award for Lifetime Achievement in Glycobiology.
 2000: Elected to the Johns Hopkins University Society of Scholars, Baltimore MD
 1998: Karl Meyer Award of the Society for Glycobiology.
 1998: Honorary degree, Universität der Bodenkultur (BOKU), Vienna, Austria.
 1989,1990,1992: visiting professor, Universitat der Bodenkultur, Vienna, Austria.
 1995: Elected as a Fellow of the Royal Society of Canada
 1990s: member and chair of the Medical Review Panel of the Gairdner Foundation International Awards
 1989: Sandoz Lecture, Clinical Research Society of Toronto.
 1989: visiting professor, Donders Chair, University of Utrecht, Netherlands.
 1985: Boehringer Mannheim Prize in Biochemistry
 1981: Terry Fox Special Initiatives Program research award for cancer research
 1964: Starr Medal (University of Toronto, Postgraduate Research)
 1959: Cody Silver Medal (University of Toronto, Faculty of Medicine)
 1957: Alpha Omega Alpha Honor Medical Society

References

External links
 Harry Schachter's profile at The Hospital for Sick Children.
 University of Toronto, Department of Biochemistry announcement that Harry Schachter awarded the Rosalind Kornfeld Award for Lifetime Achievement in Glycobiology.
 Society for Glycobiology announcement that Harry Schachter awarded the Rosalind Kornfeld Award for Lifetime Achievement in Glycobiology.
 Harry Schachter, Google Scholar citations.
 Biochemistry at the University of Toronto - A Short History.

Living people
1933 births
Canadian biochemists
Fellows of the Royal Society of Canada
University of Toronto alumni
Academic staff of the University of Toronto
Austrian emigrants to Canada
Trinidad and Tobago emigrants to Canada